A Night in Venice may refer to:

Eine Nacht in Venedig, an 1883 operetta with music by Johann Strauss II
A Night in Venice (1934 German film), an adaptation of the operetta
A Night in Venice (1934 Hungarian film), an adaptation of the operetta
A Night in Venice (1953 film), an Austrian adaptation of the operetta